"Story of My Life" is a song recorded by English-Irish boy band One Direction. It was released on 28 October 2013 by Syco Music and Columbia Records as the second single from the group's third studio album, Midnight Memories (2013). Written by band members Niall Horan, Zayn Malik, Harry Styles, Liam Payne, and Louis Tomlinson, along with Julian Bunetta, Jamie Scott, John Ryan, and Hanoch Dagan. The lyrics speak of a tumultuous relationship leading to lament and heartbreak.

Composition
"Story of My Life" is an acoustic folktronica song with indie folk elements. It runs for a total of four minutes and five seconds. Idolator compared the song to the works of Ed Sheeran, Coldplay, and Mumford & Sons. The song is written and recorded in E-flat major. According to musicnotes.com, the song runs at 120 beats per minute.  This song was mixed by Joe Zook.

Critical reception
Sam Lanksy of Idolator called the song "surprisingly great" and noted it was a "mature midpoint" between the group's signature "rollicking pop-rock confection[s]" and "dreary ballads". Lanksy additionally called the song "merciful" and complimented it for using alternative-folk influences without "smell[ing] like spilled beer". Amy Sciarretto of PopCrush gave the song 4 out of 5 stars, calling it a "contemplative, acoustic guitar-driven song" and complimenting it for being "more memorable" than any of the group's previous works. Sciarretto noted that the song would resonate with listeners of many different ages and showed that One Direction "isn't just a boy band"; although noted the song was not as "crazy catchy" as their previous songs. Lauren Wheeler of TheCelebrityCafe.com gave the song 5 out of 5 stars noting that the lyrics were "reflective" and "much deeper than some of their bigger hits." Wheeler added that the song showed that One Direction "not only have range, but also have matured through their music."

Chart performance
On 31 October 2013, the song debuted at number one on the Irish Singles Chart, becoming One Direction's fourth number-one single in Ireland. The song also debuted at number one in New Zealand, becoming both their second number-one debut and single on the New Zealand Singles Chart. It reached number two in the UK. In Australia, the song debuted at number three on the ARIA Charts and has since been certified Gold.

In the United States, it charted at number six, giving the band their fourth U.S. top ten single. It has charted in the top 15 for 19 weeks, seven of those in the top 10, and has become the band's second-highest selling single in the U.S. after their debut single "What Makes You Beautiful" (2011). The song also reached number one on the Adult Pop Songs chart, becoming One Direction's first number one on a U.S. airplay chart. It has sold 2.8 million digital copies in the U.S. as of June 2016.

Music video
Three days before the music video was uploaded, three teasers were posted, once each day. Zayn Malik and Liam Payne also posted a picture from the video with Malik posting a picture with his sister.

The set for the “Story of My Life” music video took five entire days to build. The director of the music video Ben Winston and his crew hung up a combination of 6000 to 7000 pictures that show an evolution of each of the members of One Direction over the years. This music video allows the Directioners (i.e., super fans of this boy band) to dive a little bit deeper into the lives of the members. The fans are used to seeing them in the public eye. “Story of My Life” allows them to connect with each of the members on a more personal and intimate level by looking back at their childhood memories.

The video was directed by Ben Winston, who also directed the video for their previous single "Best Song Ever". The video was accidentally published and leaked by Vevo two days earlier when they were supposed to upload the second teaser for the music video, but it was immediately removed. It was then officially uploaded on 3 November 2013. The video features some the band's family members: Zayn's sister, Harry's mother, Liam's parents and sisters, Niall Horan's brother and Louis' grandparents (two of whom are now deceased). It starts in a dark room with the band developing photos. Afterwards, certain family photos for each member are shown, and the photos morph into the same family members doing a current recreation of the photos.
Photos included in the video consist of: Zayn, aged 7, with his little sister; Louis, aged 8, with his grandparents; Harry, aged 4, with his mother; Niall, aged 4, with his brother being aged 10 when the photo was taken; Liam aged 10, with his family.

Cover versions
 In 2014, Kurt Hummel (Chris Colfer) and Blaine Anderson (Darren Criss) performed the song in the 2014 Glee episode "The Back-up Plan".
 In 2014, Filipino singer Timmy Pavino covered the song on The Voice of the Philippines.
 In 2014, The Piano Guys covered the song with piano and cello.
 In 2014, Lissie covered the song on her Cryin' to You EP.
 In January 2015, Martin Sexton recorded a solo acoustic version of this from Electric Lady Studios.
 On 22 May 2015, The Offspring performed an acoustic version of "Story of My Life" for 94/7 Mobile Nation at Mississippi Studios.
 In 2015, Alvin and the Chipmunks and The Chipettes covered the song, with lyric changes to reflect their relationship with David Seville, for their live stage tour Alvin and the Chipmunks: The Musical.
 In 2016, Joey Graceffa and Luke Conrad covered the song.
 In 2017, the song appeared on Lea Salonga's live album Blurred Lines.
 On 12 February 2022, Natalie Imbruglia released the song after winning the third series of The Masked Singer UK as  "Panda". The single did not enter the UK Official Singles Chart Top 100, but debuted and peaked at number 49 on the UK Official Singles Sales Chart Top 100 on 18 February 2022.

Track listing
 CD single
"Story of My Life" – 4:04
"Little Things" (live version from the motion picture One Direction: This Is Us) – 3:48

 Maxi single
"Story of My Life" – 4:04
"Story of My Life" (live X Factor performance) – 4:18
"Rock Me" (live version from the motion picture One Direction: This Is Us) – 4:18
"C'mon C'mon" (live version from the motion picture One Direction: This Is Us) – 3:28

Charts and certifications

Weekly charts

Year-end charts

Certifications

References

2013 singles
One Direction songs
2013 songs
2010s ballads
Syco Music singles
Columbia Records singles
Irish Singles Chart number-one singles
Folktronica songs
Number-one singles in Denmark
Songs written by Louis Tomlinson
Songs written by Niall Horan
Songs written by Zayn Malik
Songs written by Liam Payne
Songs written by Harry Styles
Songs written by Julian Bunetta
Songs written by Jamie Scott
Songs written by John Ryan (musician)